Missy is a Holstein cow who was auctioned for $1.2 million in 2009, making her the most expensive cow in the world at that time.

Eastside Lewisdale Gold Missy is a twelve-year-old black and white Holstein cow from Canada that sold for 1.2 million dollars at the Morsan Road to the Royal Sale in Uxbridge, Ontario on Wednesday, November 11, 2009. This purchase has made Missy the current most expensive cow in the world. She was the fifth cow in the world and the second in Canada to have been sold for over 1 million dollars. Her prior owner and breeder Bloyce Thompson of Eastside Holsteins stated that "She's the most valuable young cow in the world right now [and] is one of the top show cows in North America". She was also the Grand Champion of the 2009 Western Fall National Show.

In 2011, Missy was named Supreme Grand Champion Of All Breeds at the World Dairy Expo in Madison, Wisconsin. Missy was named Supreme Grand Champion of All Breeds at the Royal Agricultural Winter Fair in Toronto, Ontario in 2011. In 2012, Missy was named Holstein Canada cow of the year.

Listed as Lot #1 she was sold to a Danish buyer. Her genetic material will now be used to help improve the breeding of the Holstein breed.

Show placing

Owner history

Daughters

References

Individual cows
2006 animal births